Moonsound is the name of a sound card released for the MSX home-computer system at the Tilburg Computer Fair in 1995. It was designed by electronic engineer Henrik Gilvad and produced by Sunrise Swiss on a semi-hobby basis.

It arrived after the US branch of Microsoft abandoned the MSX system, instead focusing on the IBM PC. The name originates from the Moonblaster software that was written for people to use the hardware plug-in synthesizer.

Overview 
Based on the Yamaha YMF278 (OPL4) sound chip, it is capable of 18 channels of FM synthesis as well as 24 channels of 12 and 16 bit sample-based synthesis. A 2 MB instrument ROM containing multisampled instruments was unusual for its time. From the factory it came equipped with one 128 KB SRAM chip for user samples.

History 
Two generations were made. The first is a small size PCB without a box. Later, a larger size PCB which fit into an MSX cartridge was available. The later version had room for two sample SRAM chips resulting in 1 MB of compressed user samples.

Sound effects 
Sound effects like chorus, delay and reverb are omitted due to cost, size and usability reasons. The Yamaha effect chip requires its own specialised memory and effect routing is basic. All 18 FM channels and 24 channels of sample-based sound shares the same effect setting. Creative step-time sequencer programmers made pseudo effects like chorus, reverb and delay by overdubbing or using dedicated channels to repeat notes with delay and stereo panning. This is effective but quickly reduces the musical complexity possible.

Specifications 
Moonsound version 1.0 had one socket for user sample RAM.
Moonsound version 1.1 and 1.2 had two sockets for up to 1 MB SRAM.
Some hackers and modders found out how to stack two additional SRAM chips resulting in 2 MB of SRAM.

Being based on the OPL4 chip, The FM registers of Moonsound are compatible with the OPL, OPL2 and OPL3 chips. The MSX-AUDIO contains a chip which is similar to and also compatible with the OPL. Therefore, some older software can make use of the Moonsound.

The 2 MB ROM contained 330 mono samples, mostly at 22.05 kHz at 12 bits, but with some drums at 44.1 kHz.

The FM part of the OPL4 chip can be configured in several ways:
 18 two-operator FM channels
 6 four-operator FM channels + 6 two-operator FM channels 
 15 two-operator FM channels + 5 FM drums
 6 four-operator FM channels + 3 two-operator FM channels + 5 FM drums

Four-operator FM allows for more complex sounds but reduces polyphony.

Eight waveforms are available for the FM synthesis portion:
 Sine
 Half-sine
 Absolute-sine
 Quarter-sine (pseudo-sawtooth)
 Alternaing-sine
 "Camel" sine
 Square
 Logarithmic sawtooth

The Moonsound audio's power supply is isolated from its digital supply in an attempt to reduce noise. It has a separate stereo audio output as it is not mixed with the internal MSX sound.

Software 

Moonblaster is a software designed by Remco Schrijvers based on his time-step sequencer software for other MSX sound cards.
Moonblaster came in two versions, one for FM and one for sample-based synthesis. Later on, Marcel Delorme took over the software development.

As most developers were active in gaming software, many game companies such as Sunrise (in the Netherlands) developed and composed music specifically for Moonsound.

List of software for the Moonsound:
 Moonblaster for Moonsound FM
 Moonblaster for Moonsound Wave 
 Moonsofts Amiga MOD file player for Moonsound
 Mid2opl4 midi file player for Moonsound
 Meridian SMF MIDI file player
 MoonDriver MML (Music Macro Language) compiler

Additional software tools were able to rip sound loops digitally from audio CDs inserted in a CD-ROM drive connected to any of the SCSI and ATA-IDE interfaces.  This software was designed by Henrik Gilvad for MSX Club Gouda and Sunrise Swiss.

The Moonsound has been emulated in MSX emulators such as blueMSX and openMSX.

See also 
 Chiptune

References

External links 
 The Ultimate MSX FAQ - Moonsound
 Meridian software
 OPL4 data sheet
 Moonsound D/A Converter spec
 Moonsound release story Tilburg 1995
 Audio examples from Moonsound in MP3 format (not all examples are purely made with Moonsound)

MSX
Sound cards